Saverio Ragno (6 December 1902 – 22 April 1969) was an Italian fencer. He competed at the 1932, 1936 and 1948 Olympics and won a gold and three silver medals. He also won 14 medals at the world championships and five Italian titles. His daughter Antonella Ragno-Lonzi became an Olympic champion in fencing in 1972.

References

External links
 

1902 births
1969 deaths
Italian male fencers
Olympic fencers of Italy
Fencers at the 1932 Summer Olympics
Fencers at the 1936 Summer Olympics
Fencers at the 1948 Summer Olympics
Olympic gold medalists for Italy
Olympic silver medalists for Italy
Olympic medalists in fencing
People from Trani
Medalists at the 1932 Summer Olympics
Medalists at the 1936 Summer Olympics
Medalists at the 1948 Summer Olympics
Sportspeople from the Province of Barletta-Andria-Trani